General Higinio Morínigo is a town in the Caazapá Department of Paraguay.

Sources 
World Gazeteer: Paraguay – World-Gazetteer.com

Populated places in the Caazapá Department